In the history of Europe, the Middle Ages or medieval period (also spelled mediæval or mediaeval) lasted approximately from the late 5th to the late 15th centuries, similar to the post-classical period of global history. It began with the fall of the Western Roman Empire and transitioned into the Renaissance and the Age of Discovery. The Middle Ages is the middle period of the three traditional divisions of Western history: classical antiquity, the medieval period, and the modern period. The medieval period is itself subdivided into the Early, High, and Late Middle Ages.

Population decline, counterurbanisation, the collapse of centralized authority, invasions, and mass migrations of tribes, which had begun in late antiquity, continued into the Early Middle Ages. The large-scale movements of the Migration Period, including various Germanic peoples, formed new kingdoms in what remained of the Western Roman Empire. In the 7th century, North Africa and the Middle East – most recently part of the Eastern Roman (or Byzantine) Empire – came under the rule of the Umayyad Caliphate, an Islamic empire, after conquest by Muhammad's successors. Although there were substantial changes in society and political structures, the break with classical antiquity was not complete. The still-sizeable Byzantine Empire, Rome's direct continuation, survived in the Eastern Mediterranean and remained a major power. Secular law was advanced greatly by the Code of Justinian. In the West, most kingdoms incorporated extant Roman institutions, while new bishoprics and monasteries were founded as Christianity expanded in Europe. The Franks, under the Carolingian dynasty, briefly established the Carolingian Empire during the later 8th and early 9th centuries. It covered much of Western Europe but later succumbed to the pressures of internal civil wars combined with external invasions: Vikings from the north, Magyars from the east, and Saracens from the south.

During the High Middle Ages, which began after 1000, the population of Europe increased greatly as technological and agricultural innovations allowed trade to flourish and the Medieval Warm Period climate change allowed crop yields to increase. Manorialism, the organisation of peasants into villages that owed rent and labour services to the nobles, and feudalism, the political structure whereby knights and lower-status nobles owed military service to their overlords in return for the right to rent from lands and manors, were two of the ways society was organised in the High Middle Ages. This period also saw the formal division of the Catholic and Orthodox churches, with the East–West Schism of 1054. The Crusades, which began in 1095, were military attempts by Western European Christians to regain control of the Holy Land from Muslims, and also contributed to the expansion of Latin Christendom in the Baltic region and the Iberian Peninsula. Kings became the heads of centralised nation states, reducing crime and violence but making the ideal of a unified Christendom more distant. In the West, intellectual life was marked by scholasticism, a philosophy that emphasised joining faith to reason, and by the founding of universities. The theology of Thomas Aquinas, the paintings of Giotto, the poetry of Dante and Chaucer, the travels of Marco Polo, and the Gothic architecture of cathedrals such as Chartres mark the end of this period.

The Late Middle Ages was marked by difficulties and calamities including famine, plague, and war, which significantly diminished the population of Europe; between 1347 and 1350, the Black Death killed about a third of Europeans. Controversy, heresy, and the Western Schism within the Catholic Church paralleled the interstate conflict, civil strife, and peasant revolts that occurred in the kingdoms. Cultural and technological developments transformed European society, concluding the Late Middle Ages and beginning the early modern period.

Terminology and periodisation
The Middle Ages is one of the three major periods in the most enduring scheme for analysing European history: Antiquity, the Middle Ages and the Modern Period.

Medieval writers divided history into periods such as the "Six Ages" or the "Four Empires", and considered their time to be the last before the end of the world. The concept of living in a "middle age" was alien to them, and they referred to themselves as "", or "we modern people". In their concept, their age had begun when Christ had brought light to mankind, and they contrasted the light of their age with the spiritual darkness of previous periods. The Italian humanist and poet Petrarch (d. 1374) was the first to revise the metaphor. He was convinced that a period of decline had begun when emperors of non-Italian origin assumed power in the Roman Empire, and described it as an age of "darkness". His concept was further developed by humanists like Giovanni Boccaccio (d. 1375) and Filippo Villani who emphasized the "rebirth" of culture in their age after a long period of cultural darkness. Leonardo Bruni was the first historian to use tripartite periodisation in his History of the Florentine People (1442), with a middle period "between the fall of the Roman Empire and the revival of city life sometime in late eleventh and twelfth centuries". Tripartite periodisation became standard after the 17th-century German historian Christoph Cellarius divided history into three periods: ancient, medieval, and modern.

The most commonly given starting point for the Middle Ages is around 500, with the date of 476—the year the last Western Roman Emperor was deposed—first used by Bruni. Later starting dates are sometimes used in the outer parts of Europe. For Europe as a whole, 1500 is often considered to be the end of the Middle Ages, but there is no universally agreed-upon end date. Depending on the context, events such as the conquest of Constantinople by the Turks in 1453, Christopher Columbus's first voyage to the Americas in 1492,  or the Protestant Reformation in 1517 are sometimes used. English historians often use the Battle of Bosworth Field in 1485 to mark the end of the period. For Spain, dates commonly used are the death of King Ferdinand II in 1516, the death of Queen Isabella I of Castile in 1504, or the conquest of Granada in 1492.

Historians from Romance-speaking countries tend to divide the Middle Ages into two parts: an earlier "High" and later "Low" period. English-speaking historians, following their German counterparts, generally subdivide the Middle Ages into three intervals: "Early", "High", and "Late". In the 19th century, the entire Middle Ages were often referred to as the "Dark Ages", but with the adoption of these subdivisions, use of this term was restricted to the Early Middle Ages in the early 20th century.

Later Roman Empire

The Roman Empire reached its greatest territorial extent during the 2nd century AD; the following two centuries witnessed the slow decline of Roman control over its outlying territories. Runaway inflation, external pressure on the frontiers, and outbreaks of plague combined to create the Crisis of the Third Century, with emperors coming to the throne only to be rapidly replaced by new usurpers. Military expenses increased steadily during the 3rd century, mainly in response to the war with the newly established Sasanian Empire. The army doubled in size, and cavalry and smaller units replaced the Roman legion as the main tactical unit. The need for revenue led to increased taxes and a decline in numbers of the curial, or landowning, class, and decreasing numbers of them willing to shoulder the burdens of holding office in their native towns. More bureaucrats were needed in the central administration to deal with the needs of the army, which led to complaints from civilians that there were more tax-collectors in the empire than tax-payers.

The Emperor Diocletian (r. 284–305) split the empire into separately administered eastern and western halves in 286. This system, which eventually encompassed two senior and two junior co-emperors (hence known as the Tetrarchy) stabilised the imperial government for about two decades. Diocletian's further reforms strengthened the governmental bureaucracy, reformed taxation, and strengthened the army, which bought the empire time but did not resolve the problems it was facing: excessive taxation, a declining birthrate, and pressures on its frontiers, among others. In 330, after a period of civil war, Constantine the Great (r. 306–337) refounded the city of Byzantium as the newly renamed eastern capital, Constantinople. For much of the 4th century, Roman society stabilised in a new form that differed from the earlier classical period, with a widening gulf between the rich and poor, and a decline in the vitality of the smaller towns. Another change was the Christianisation, or conversion of the empire to Christianity. The process was stimulated by the 3rd-century crisis, accelerated by the conversion of Constantine the Great, and by the end of the century Christianity emerged as the empire's dominant religion. Debates about Christian theology, customs and ethics intensified. Mainstream Christianity developed under imperial patronage, and those who persisted with theological views condemned at the Church leaders' general assemblies known as ecumenical councils had to endure official persecution. Heretic views could survive by popular support, or through intensive proselytizing activities. Examples include the uncompromisingly Monophysite Syrians and Egyptians, and the spread of Arianism among the Germanic peoples. Judaism remained a tolerated religion although legislation limited the Jews' rights, hindering conversion of Christians to Judaism.

Civil war between rival emperors became common in the middle of the 4th century, diverting soldiers from the empire's frontier forces and allowing invaders to encroach. Although the movements of peoples during this period are usually described as "invasions", they were not just military expeditions but migrations of entire peoples into the empire. In 376, the Goths, fleeing from the Huns, received permission from Emperor Valens (r. 364–378) to settle in Roman territory in the Balkans. The settlement did not go smoothly, and when Roman officials mishandled the situation, the Goths began to raid and plunder. Valens, attempting to put down the disorder, was killed fighting the Goths at the Battle of Adrianople on 9 August 378. In 401, the Visigoths, a Gothic group, invaded the Western Roman Empire and, although briefly forced back from Italy, in 410 sacked the city of Rome. In 406 the Alans, Vandals, and Suevi crossed into Gaul; over the next three years they spread across Gaul and in 409 crossed the Pyrenees Mountains into modern-day Spain. The Franks, Alemanni, and the Burgundians all ended up in Gaul while the Angles, Saxons, and Jutes settled in Britain, and the Vandals went on to cross the strait of Gibraltar after which they conquered the province of Africa. The Hunnic king Attila (r. 434–453) led invasions into the Balkans in 442 and 447, Gaul in 451, and Italy in 452. The Hunnic threat remained until Attila's death in 453, when the Hunnic confederation he led fell apart.

When dealing with the migrations, the eastern and western elites applied different methods. The Eastern Romans combined the deployment of armed forces with gifts and grants of offices to the tribal leaders. The Western aristocrats failed to support the army but refused to pay tribute to prevent invasions by the tribes. These invasions completely changed the political and demographic nature of the western section of the empire. By the end of the 5th century it was divided into smaller political units, ruled by the tribes that had invaded in the early part of the century. The emperors of the 5th century were often controlled by military strongmen such as Stilicho (d. 408), Aetius (d. 454), Aspar (d. 471), Ricimer (d. 472), or Gundobad (d. 516), who were partly or fully of non-Roman ancestry. The deposition of the last emperor of the west, Romulus Augustulus, in 476 has traditionally marked the end of the Western Roman Empire. The Eastern Roman Empire, often referred to as the Byzantine Empire after the fall of its western counterpart, had little ability to assert control over the lost western territories. The Byzantine emperors maintained a claim over the territory, but while none of the new kings in the west dared to elevate himself to the position of emperor of the west, Byzantine control of most of the Western Empire could not be sustained.

Early Middle Ages

New realms

In the post-Roman world ethnic identities were flexible, often determined by loyalty to a successful military leader or by religion instead of ancestry or language. Ethnic markers quickly changed—by around 500, Arianism, originally a genuine Roman heresy, was associated with Germanic peoples, and the Goths rarely used their Germanic language outside their churches. The fusion of Roman culture with the customs of the invading tribes is well documented. Popular assemblies that allowed free male tribal members more say in political matters than had been common in the Roman state developed into legislative and judicial bodies. Material artefacts left by the Romans and the invaders are often similar, and tribal items were often modelled on Roman objects. Much of the scholarly and written culture of the new kingdoms was also based on Roman intellectual traditions. An important difference was the gradual loss of tax revenue by the new polities. Many of the new political entities no longer supported their armies through taxes, instead relying on granting them land or rents. This meant there was less need for large tax revenues and so the taxation systems decayed.

Among the new peoples filling the political void left by Roman centralised government, the first Germanic groups now collectively known as Anglo-Saxons settled in Britain before the middle of the 5th century. The local culture had little impact on their way of life, but the linguistic assimilation of masses of the local Celtic Britons to the newcomers is evident. By around 600, new political centres emerged, some local leaders accumulated considerable wealth, and a number of small kingdoms were formed. From among these realms, the kingdoms of Northumbria, Mercia, Wessex, and East Anglia emerged as dominant powers by the end of the 7th century. Smaller kingdoms in present-day Wales and Scotland were still under the control of the native Britons and Picts. Ireland was divided into even smaller political units, usually known as tribal kingdoms, under the control of kings. There were perhaps as many as 150 local kings in Ireland, of varying importance.

The Ostrogoths, a Gothic tribe moved to Italy from the Balkans in the late 5th century under Theoderic the Great (r. 493–526). He set up a kingdom marked by its co-operation between the Italians and the Ostrogoths, at least until the last years of his reign. Power struggles between Romanized and traditionalist Ostrogothic groups followed his death, providing the opportunity for the Byzantines to reconquer Italy in the middle of 6th century. The Burgundians settled in Gaul, and after an earlier realm was destroyed by the Huns in 436, formed a new kingdom in the 440s. Between today's Geneva and Lyon, it grew to become the realm of Burgundy in the late 5th and early 6th centuries. Elsewhere in Gaul, the Franks and Celtic Britons set up stable polities. Francia was centred in northern Gaul, and the first king of whom much is known is Childeric I (d. 481). Under Childeric's son Clovis I (r. 509–511), the founder of the Merovingian dynasty, the Frankish kingdom expanded and converted to Christianity. Unlike other Germanic peoples, the Franks accepted Catholicism which facilitated their cooperation with the native Gallo-Roman aristocracy. Britons fleeing from  – modern-day Great Britain – settled in what is now Brittany.

Other monarchies were established by the Visigoths in the Iberian Peninsula, the Suebi in northwestern Iberia, and the Vandals in North Africa. The Lombards settled in Pannonia, but the influx of the nomadic Avars from the Asian steppes to Central Europe forced them to move on to Northern Italy in 568. Here they conquered the lands once held by the Ostrogoths from the Byzantines, and established a new kingdom composed of town-based duchies. By the end of the 6th century, the Avars conquered most Slavic, Turkic and Germanic tribes in the lowlands along the Lower and Middle Danube, and they were routinely able to force the Eastern emperors to pay tribute. Around 670, another steppe people, the Bulgars settled at the Danube Delta. In 681, they defeated a Byzantine imperial army, and established a new empire on the Lower Danube, subjugating the local Slavic tribes.

During the invasions, some regions received a larger influx of new peoples than others. In Gaul for instance, the invaders settled much more extensively in the north-east than in the south-west. Slavs settled in Central and Eastern Europe and the Balkan Peninsula. The settlement of peoples was accompanied by changes in languages. Latin, the literary language of the Western Roman Empire, was gradually replaced by vernacular languages which evolved from Latin, but were distinct from it, collectively known as Romance languages. These changes from Latin to the new languages took many centuries. Greek remained the language of the Byzantine Empire, but the migrations of the Slavs expanded the area of Slavic languages in Eastern Europe.

Byzantine survival

As Western Europe witnessed the formation of new kingdoms, the Eastern Roman Empire remained intact and experienced an economic revival that lasted into the early 7th century. There were fewer invasions of the eastern section of the empire; most occurred in the Balkans. Peace with the Sasanian Empire, the traditional enemy of Rome, lasted throughout most of the 5th century. The Eastern Empire was marked by closer relations between the political state and Christian Church, with doctrinal matters assuming an importance in Eastern politics that they did not have in Western Europe. Legal developments included the codification of Roman law; the first effort – the Codex Theodosianus – was completed in 438. Under Emperor Justinian (r. 527–565), a more comprehensive compilation took place, the Corpus Juris Civilis.

Justinian almost lost his throne during the Nika riots, a popular revolt of elementary force that destroyed half of Constantinople in 532. After crushing the revolt, he reinforced the autocratic elements of the imperial government and mobilized his troops against the heretic western realms. The general Belisarius (d. 565) conquered North Africa from the Vandals, and attacked the Ostrogoths, but the Italian campaign was interrupted due to an unexpected Sasanian invasion from the east. For the movement of troops from the Balkan provinces left the region virtually unprotected, the neighboring Slavic and Turkic tribes intensified their plundering raids across the Danube. Between 541 and 543, a deadly outbreak of plague decimated the empire's population, and the epidemic swept through the Mediterranean several times during the following decades. Justinian was to apply new methods to counterbalance its negative effects. He covered the lack of military personnel by developing an extensive system of border forts. To reduce fiscal deficit, he nationalized the silk industry and ceased to finance the maintenance of public roads. In a decade, he resumed expansionism, completing the conquest of the Ostrogothic kingdom, and seizing much of southern Spain from the Visigoths.

Justinian's reconquests and excessive building program have been criticised by historians for bringing his realm to the brink of bankruptcy, but many of the difficulties faced by Justinian's successors were probably due to other factors, including the epidemic. An additional problem to face the empire came as a result of the massive expansion of the Avars and their Slav allies. They conquered the Balkans and Greece with the exception of a few coastal cities before their assault on Constantinople was repulsed in 626. In the east, border defences collapsed during a new war with the Sasanian Empire and the Persians seized large chunks of the empire, including Egypt, Syria, and much of Anatolia. A Persian army approached Constantinople to join the Avars and Slavs during the siege but a Byzantine fleet prevented them from crossing the Bosporus in 626. Two years later, Emperor Heraclius (r. 610–641) launched an unexpected counterattack against the heart of the Sassanian Empire bypassing the Persian army in the mountainous regions of Anatolia. He triumphed and the empire recovered all of its lost territories in the east in a new peace treaty.

Western society

In Western Europe, some of the older Roman elite families died out while others became more involved with ecclesiastical than secular affairs. Values attached to Latin scholarship and education mostly disappeared, and while literacy remained important, it became a practical skill rather than a sign of elite status. In the 4th century, Jerome (d. 420) dreamed that God rebuked him for spending more time reading Cicero than the Bible. By the 6th century, Gregory of Tours (d. 594) had a similar dream, but instead of being chastised for reading Cicero, he was chastised for learning shorthand. By the late 6th century, the principal means of religious instruction in the Church had become music and art rather than the book. Most intellectual efforts went towards imitating classical scholarship, but some original works were created, along with now-lost oral compositions. The writings of Sidonius Apollinaris (d. 489), Cassiodorus (d. ), and Boethius (d. ) were typical of the age.

Changes also took place among laymen, as aristocratic culture focused on great feasts held in halls rather than on literary pursuits. Clothing for the elites was richly embellished with jewels and gold. Lords and kings supported entourages of fighters who formed the backbone of the military forces. Family ties within the elites were important, as were the virtues of loyalty, courage, and honour. These ties led to the prevalence of the feud in aristocratic society, examples of which included those related by Gregory of Tours that took place in Merovingian Gaul. Most feuds seem to have ended quickly with the payment of some sort of compensation.

Women took part in aristocratic society mainly in their roles as wives and mothers of men, with the role of mother of a ruler being especially prominent in Merovingian Gaul. In Anglo-Saxon society the lack of many child rulers meant a lesser role for women as queen mothers, but this was compensated for by the increased role played by abbesses of monasteries. In contrast, in medieval Italy women were always considered under the protection and control of a male relative. Women's influence on politics was particularly fragile, and early medieval authors tended to depict powerful women in a bad light. Examples include the Arian queen Goiswintha (d. 589), a vehement but unsuccessful opponent of the Visigoth's conversion to Catholicism, and the Frankish queen Brunhilda of Austrasia (d. 613) who was torn to pieces by horses after her enemies captured her at the age of 70. Women usually died at considerably younger age than men, primarily due to infanticide and complications at childbirth. Infanticide was not an unusual practice in times of famine, and daughters fell victim to it more frequently than their brothers who could potentially do harder works. Clerics censured sexual unions outside marriage, and monogamy became also the norm of secular law in the 9th century.

Peasant society is much less documented than the nobility. Most of the surviving information available to historians comes from archaeology; few detailed written records documenting peasant life remain from before the 9th century. Most of the descriptions of the lower classes come from either law codes or writers from the upper classes. Landholding patterns were not uniform; some areas had greatly fragmented landholding patterns, but in other areas large contiguous blocks of land were the norm. These differences allowed for a wide variety of peasant societies, some dominated by aristocratic landholders and others having a great deal of autonomy. Land settlement also varied greatly. Some peasants lived in large settlements that numbered as many as 700 inhabitants. Others lived in small groups of a few families and still others lived on isolated farms spread over the countryside. There were also areas where the pattern was a mix of two or more of those systems. Legislation made a clear distinction between free and unfree, but there was no sharp break between the legal status of the free peasant and the aristocrat, and it was possible for a free peasant's family to rise into the aristocracy over several generations through military service. Demand for slaves was covered through warring and raids. Initially, the Franks' expansion and conflicts between the Anglo-Saxon realms supplied the slave market with prisoners of war and captives. Christian ethics brought about significant changes in the position of slaves in the 7th and 8th centuries. They were no more regarded as their lords' property, and their right to a decent treatment was enacted.

Roman city life and culture changed greatly in the early Middle Ages. Although Italian cities remained inhabited, they contracted significantly in size. Rome, for instance, shrank from a population of hundreds of thousands to around 30,000 by the end of the 6th century. Roman temples were converted into Christian churches and city walls remained in use. In Northern Europe, cities also shrank, while civic monuments and other public buildings were raided for building materials. The establishment of new kingdoms often meant some growth for the towns chosen as capitals. The Jewish communities survived the fall of the Western Roman Empire in Spain, southern Gaul and Italy. The Visigothic kings made concentrated efforts to convert the Hispanic Jews to Christianity in the 7th century but the Jewish community quickly regenerated after the Muslim conquest. Under Muslim rule, the Jews' activities were less limited, and the Muslim rulers regularly employed them in their courts. In contrast, Christian legislation forbade the Jews' appointment to government positions.

Rise of Islam

Religious beliefs were in flux in the lands along the Eastern Roman and Persian frontiers during the late 6th and early 7th centuries. State-sponsored Christian missionaries proselytised among the pagan steppe peoples, and the Persians made attempts to enforce their Zoroastrianism on the Christian Armenians. Judaism was an active proselytising faith, and at least one Arab political leader—Dhu Nuwas, ruler of what is today Yemen—converted to it. The emergence of Islam in Arabia during the lifetime of Muhammad (d. 632) brought about more radical changes. After his death, Islamic forces conquered much of the Near East, starting with Syria in 634–35, continuing with Persia between 637 and 642, and reaching Egypt in 640–41. In the eastern Mediterranean, the Muslim expansion was halted at Constantinople. The Eastern Romans used the Greek Fire, a highly combustible liquid, to defend their capital in 674–78 and 717–18. In the west, the advance of Islamic troops continued. They conquered North Africa by the early 8th century, annihilated the Visigothic Kingdom in 711, and invaded southern France from 713.

The Muslim conquerors bypassed the mountainous northwestern region of the Iberian Peninsula. Here a small kingdom, Asturias emerged as the centre of local resistance. The defeat of Muslim forces at the Battle of Tours in 732 led to the reconquest of southern France by the Franks, but the main reason for the halt of Islamic growth in Europe was the overthrow of the Umayyad Caliphate and its replacement by the Abbasid Caliphate. The Abbasids moved their capital to Baghdad and were more concerned with the Middle East than Europe, losing control of sections of the Muslim lands. Umayyad descendants took over Al-Andalus (or Muslim Spain), the Aghlabids controlled North Africa, and the Tulunids became rulers of Egypt.

Trade and economy

The migrations and invasions of the 4th and 5th centuries disrupted trade networks around the Mediterranean. African goods stopped being imported into Europe, first disappearing from the interior and by the 7th century found only in a few cities such as Rome or Naples. By the end of the 7th century, under the impact of the Muslim conquests, African products were no longer found in Western Europe. The replacement of goods from long-range trade with local products was a trend throughout the old Roman lands that happened in the Early Middle Ages. This was especially marked in the lands that did not lie on the Mediterranean, such as northern Gaul or Britain. Non-local goods appearing in the archaeological record are usually luxury goods or metalworks. In the 7th and 8th centuries, new commercial networks were developing in northern Europe. Goods like furs, walrus ivory and amber were delivered from the Baltic region to western Europe, contributing to the development of new trade centers in East Anglia, northern Francia and Scandinavia. Conflicts over the control of trade routes and toll stations were common, and those who failed turned to raiding or settled in foreign lands.

The flourishing Islamic economies' constant demand for fresh labour force and raw materials opened up a new market for Europe around 750. Europe emerged as a major supplier of house slaves and slave soldiers for Al-Andalus, northern Africa and the Levant. Located in the vicinity of the Central European slave hunting areas, Venice developed into the most important European center of slave trade. In addition, timber, fur and arms were delivered from Europe to the Mediterranean, while Europe imported spices, medicine, incense, and silk from the Levant. The demand for exotic merchandise was reinforced primarily by internal factors, like population growth, and improved agricultural productivity. The large rivers connecting distant regions facilitated the expansion of transcontinental trade. Contemporaneous reports indicate that Anglo-Saxon merchants visited fairs at Paris, pirates preyed on tradesman travelling on the Danube, and Eastern Frankish merchants reached as far as Zaragoza in Al-Andalus.

The various Germanic states in the west all had coinages that imitated existing Roman and Byzantine forms. Gold continued to be minted until the end of the 7th century in 693-94 when it was replaced by silver in the Merovingian kingdom. The basic Frankish silver coin was the denarius or denier, while the Anglo-Saxon version was called a penny. From these areas, the denier or penny spread throughout Europe from 700 to 1000 AD. Copper or bronze coins were not struck, nor were gold except in Southern Europe. No silver coins denominated in multiple units were minted.

Church life

The idea of Christian unity endured although differences in ideology and practice between the Eastern and Western Churches became apparent by the 6th century. The formation of new realms reinforced the traditional Christian concept of the separation of church and state in the west, whereas this notion was alien to eastern clergymen who regarded the Roman state as an instrument of divine providence. In the Eastern Christians' view, an individual could be saved from sin through direct mystical communication with God, but western clerics tended to regard themselves as unavoidable intercessors. In the late 7th century, clerical marriage emerged as a permanent focus of controversy: the Latin Church promoted complete celibacy while the eastern clergy insisted on the more tolerant traditional approach. After the Muslim conquest of the Levant, the Byzantine emperors could less effectively intervene in the west. When Leo III (r. 717–741) prohibited the display of paintings representing human figures in places of worship, the papacy openly censured the emperor's iconoclast doctrine and  his claim to declare new dogmas by imperial edicts. Although the Byzantine Church condemned iconoclasm in 843, further issues such as fierce rivalry for ecclesiastic jurisdiction over newly converted peoples, and the unilateral modification of the Nicene Creed in the west widened to the extent that the differences were greater than the similarities.

The ecclesiastical structure of the Roman Empire survived the movements and invasions in the west mostly intact, but the papacy was little regarded, and few of the Western bishops looked to the bishop of Rome for religious or political leadership. Many of the popes prior to 750 were more concerned with Byzantine affairs and Eastern theological controversies. The register, or archived copies of the letters, of Pope Gregory the Great (pope 590–604) survived, and of those more than 850 letters, the vast majority were concerned with affairs in Italy or Constantinople. The only part of Western Europe where the papacy had influence was Britain, where Gregory had sent the Gregorian mission in 597 to convert the Anglo-Saxons to Christianity. Irish missionaries were most active in Western Europe between the 5th and the 7th centuries, going first to England and Scotland and then on to the continent. Under such monks as Columba (d. 597) and Columbanus (d. 615), they founded monasteries, taught in Latin and Greek, and authored secular and religious works. Early medieval people did not visit churches regularly. Instead, meetings with itinerant clergy and pilgrimages to popular saints' shrines were instrumental in the spread of Christian teaching. From the 6th century, Irish and British clerics developed special handbooks to determine the appropriate acts of penance—typically prayers, and fasts—for sinners. These penitentials were introduced in the Continent by missionaries from the British Isles. They covered several aspects of everyday life but placed a special emphasis on sexuality. To defend monogamous marriage, they prescribed severe penances for adulterers, fornicators and those engaged in non-reproductive sexual acts, such as homosexuals. In contrast with mainstream Christianity, the Bogomils of the Balkans also condemned sexual reproduction for in their dualist cosmology the Satan was responsible for the creation of the physical universe.

The Early Middle Ages witnessed the rise of Christian monasticism. The shape of European monasticism was determined by traditions and ideas that originated with the Desert Fathers of Egypt. Monastic ideals spread through hagiographical literature such as the Life of Anthony. Most European monasteries were of the type that focuses on community experience of the spiritual life, called cenobitism, which was pioneered by the Egyptian hermit Pachomius (d. ). Bishop Basil of Caesarea (d. 379) wrote a monastic rule for a community of Cappadocian ascetics which served as a highly esteemed template for similar regulations in the Mediterranean. These mainly covered the spiritual aspects of monasticism. In contrast, the Italian monk Benedict of Nursia (d. 547) adopted a more practical approach, regulating both the administrative and spiritual responsibilities of a community of monks led by an abbot. The Benedictine Rule became widely used in western monasteries already before it was decreed the norm for Frankish monastic communities in 817. In the east, the monastic rules compiled by Theodore the Studite (d. 826) gained popularity after they were adopted in the Great Lavra, a newly established imperial monastery on Mount Athos in the 960s, setting a precedent for further Athonite monasteries, and turning the mount into the most important centre of Orthodox monasticism.

Monks and monasteries had a deep effect on the religious and political life of the Early Middle Ages, in various cases acting as land trusts for powerful families and important centres of political authority. They were the main and sometimes only outposts of education and literacy in a region. Many of the surviving manuscripts of the Latin classics were copied in monasteries in the Early Middle Ages. Monks were also the authors of new works, including history, theology, and other subjects, written by authors such as Bede (d. 735), a native of northern England. The Byzantine missionary Constantine (d. 869) developed Old Church Slavonic as a new liturgical language enriching Slavic vocabulary with Greek religious terms. He also created an alphabet, likely the Glagolitic script, for it. These innovations established the basis for a flourishing Slavic religious literature. Constantine died as the monk Cyril in a Roman monastery. His work was continued by his brother Methodius (d. 885) and their pupils. A version of Greek uncial script now known as Cyrillic replaced Glagolitic after around 900.

In Western Christendom, lay influence over Church affairs came to a climax in the 10th century. Aristocrats regarded the churches and monasteries under their patronage as their personal property, and simony—the sale of Church offices—was a common practice. Simony aroused a general fear about salvation as many believed that irregularly appointed priests could not confer valid sacraments such as baptism. Monastic communities were the first to react to this fear by the rigorous observance of their rules. The establishment of Cluny Abbey in Burgundy in 909 initiated a more radical change as Cluny was freed from lay control and placed under the protection of the papacy. The Cluniac Reforms spread through the founding of new monasteries and the reform of monastic life in old abbeys under the auspices of the abbots of Cluny. Cluny's example indicated that the reformist idea of the "Liberty of the Church" could be achieved through submission to the papacy.

Carolingian Europe

Royal authority was substantially weak in Francia. The Merovingian kings customarily distributed the kingdom among their sons and destroyed their own power base by extensive land grants. In the northeastern Frankish realm Austrasia, the Arnulfings were the most prominent beneficiaries of royal favour. As hereditary Mayors of the Palace, they were the power behind the Austrasian throne from the mid-7th century. The Arnulfings consolidated their authority by keeping their patrimony undivided through generations, and one of them, Pepin of Herstal (d. 714) also assumed power in the central Frankish realm Neustria. His successor Charles Martel (d. 741) took advantage of the permanent Muslim threat to confiscate church property and raise new troops by parcelling it out among the recruits. His victory over an expeditionary force from Al-Andalus in the Battle of Tours brought him enormous prestige.

The Carolingians, as Charles Martel's descendants are known, succeeded the Merovingians as the new royal dynasty of Francia in 751. This year the last Merovingian king Childeric III (r. 743–751) was deposed, and Charles Martel's son Pepin the Short (r. 751–768) was crowned king with the consent of the papacy and the Frankish leaders. Two or three years later Pope Stephen II (pope 752–757) personally sanctioned the coup by anointing Pepin and his two sons with chrism during his visit to Francia. He came to persuade Pepin to attack the Lombards whose expansion menaced the city of Rome. Pepin defeated the Lombards and enforced their promise to respect the possessions of the papacy. His subsequent donation of Central Italian territories to the Holy See marked the beginnings of the Papal States. At the time of his death in 768, Pepin left his kingdom in the hands of his two sons, Charles (r. 768–814) and Carloman (r. 768–771). When Carloman died of natural causes, Charles blocked the succession of Carloman's young son and installed himself as the king of the reunited Francia. Charles, more often known as Charles the Great or Charlemagne, embarked upon a programme of systematic expansion in 772. In the wars that lasted beyond 800, he rewarded allies with war booty and command over parcels of land. Charlemagne subjugated the Saxons, conquered the Lombards, and created a new border province in northern Spain. Between 791 and 803, Frankish troops annihilated the Avars' empire which facilitated the development of small Slavic principalities, mainly ruled by ambitious warlords under Frankish suzerainty.

The coronation of Charlemagne as emperor on Christmas Day 800 is regarded as a turning point in medieval history, marking a return of the Western Roman Empire, since the new emperor ruled over much of the area previously controlled by the Western emperors. It also marks a change in Charlemagne's relationship with the Byzantine Empire, as the assumption of the imperial title by the Carolingians asserted their equivalence to the Byzantine state. In 812, as a result of careful and protracted negotiations, the Byzantines acknowledged Charlemagne's title of "emperor" but without recognizing him as a second "emperor of the Romans", or accepting his successors' claim to use his new title. The empire was administered by an itinerant court that travelled with the emperor, as well as approximately 300 imperial officials called counts, who administered the counties the empire had been divided into. The central administration supervised the counts through imperial emissaries called missi dominici, who served as roving inspectors and troubleshooters. The clerics of the royal chapel were responsible for recording important royal grants and decisions.

Carolingian Renaissance

Charlemagne's court in Aachen was the centre of the cultural revival sometimes referred to as the "Carolingian Renaissance". Literacy increased, as did development in the arts, architecture and jurisprudence, as well as liturgical and scriptural studies. The English monk Alcuin (d. 804) was invited to Aachen and brought the education available in the monasteries of Northumbria. Charlemagne's chancery—or writing office—made use of a new script today known as Carolingian minuscule, allowing a common writing style that advanced communication across much of Europe. Charlemagne sponsored changes in church liturgy, imposing the Roman form of church service on his domains, as well as the Gregorian chant in liturgical music for the churches. An important activity for scholars during this period was the copying, correcting, and dissemination of basic works on religious and secular topics, with the aim of encouraging learning. New works on religious topics and schoolbooks were also produced. Grammarians of the period modified the Latin language, changing it from the Classical Latin of the Roman Empire into a more flexible form to fit the needs of the Church and government. By the reign of Charlemagne, the language had so diverged from the classical Latin that it was later called Medieval Latin.

Breakup of the Carolingian Empire

Charlemagne continued the Frankish tradition of dividing his empire between all his sons, but only one son, Louis the Pious (r. 814–840), was still alive by 813. Just before Charlemagne died in 814, he made Louis co-emperor. Louis's reign of 26 years was marked by numerous divisions of the empire among his sons. Initially, Louis promised the bulk of his empire to his eldest son  (d. 855) and invested him as co-emperor. He granted two marginal provinces, Aquitaine and Bavaria to his younger sons Pepin (d. 838) and Louis the German (d. 876), while Lothair received the Kingdom of Italy from him. When his second wife Judith (d. 843) gave birth to a fourth son Charles the Bald (d. 877), Louis decided to revise his previous plans about the division of the empire. This led to civil wars between various alliances of father and sons over the control of various parts of the empire. When Pepin died, Louis forged an alliance between Lothair and Charles by proposing to divide the empire into two nearly equal parts between them, and leaving only Bavaria to the middle child, Louis, but Lothair's claim to suzerainty over his younger brothers caused a new civil war after their father's death.

By the Treaty of Verdun (843), a kingdom between the Rhine and Rhone rivers was created for Lothair to go with his lands in Italy, and his imperial title was recognised. Louis the German was in control of Bavaria and the eastern lands in modern-day Germany. Charles the Bald received the western Frankish lands, comprising most of modern-day France. Charlemagne's grandsons and great-grandsons divided their kingdoms between their descendants, eventually causing all internal cohesion to be lost. There was a brief re-uniting of the empire by Charles the Fat in 884, although the actual units of the empire were not merged and retained their separate administrations. Charles was deposed in 887 and died in January 888. By that time, the Carolingians were close to extinction, and non-dynastic claimants assumed power in most of the successor states, such as Odo of Paris (r. 888–898) in West Francia, and the rival kings Berengar of Friuli (r. 888–924) and Guy of Spoleto (r. 889–894) in Italy. In the eastern lands the dynasty died out with the death of Louis the Child (r. 899–911), and the selection of the Franconian duke Conrad I (r. 911–918) as king. In West Francia the dynasty was restored first in 898, then in 936, but the last Carolingian kings were unable to keep the powerful aristocracy under control. In 987 the dynasty was replaced, with the crowning of Hugh Capet (r. 987–996) as king.

Frankish culture and the Carolingian methods of state administration had a significant impact on the neighboring peoples, and Frankish threat triggered the formation of new states along the empire's eastern frontier—Bohemia in the shelter of the Bohemian Forest, Moravia along the Middle Danube, and Croatia on the Adriatic coast. The breakup of the Carolingian Empire was accompanied by invasions, migrations, and raids by external foes. The Atlantic and northern shores were harassed by the Vikings, who also raided the British Isles and settled there. In 911, the Viking chieftain Rollo (d. c. 931) received permission from the Frankish king Charles the Simple (r. 898–922) to settle in what became Normandy. The eastern parts of the Frankish kingdoms, especially Germany and Italy, were under continual Magyar assault until the invaders' defeat at the Battle of Lechfeld in 955. The breakup of the Abbasid dynasty meant that the Islamic world fragmented into smaller political states, some of which began expanding. The Aghlabids conquered Sicily, the Umayyads of Al-Andalus annexed the Balearic Islands, and Arab pirates launched regular raids against Italy and southern France.

New kingdoms and Byzantine revival

The Vikings' settlement in the British Isles led to the formation of new political entities, including the small but militant Kingdom of Dublin in Ireland. In Anglo-Saxon England, King Alfred the Great (r. 871–899) came to an agreement with the Danish invaders in 879, acknowledging the existence of an independent Viking realm in Northumbria, East Anglia and eastern Mercia. By the middle of the 10th century, Alfred's successors had conquered the territory, and restored English control over most of the southern part of Great Britain. In northern Britain, Kenneth MacAlpin (d. c. 860) united the Picts and the Scots into the Kingdom of Alba. In the early 10th century, the Ottonian dynasty established itself in Germany, and was engaged in driving back the Magyars and fighting the disobedient dukes. After an appeal by the widowed Queen Adelaide of Italy (d. 999) for protection, the German king  (r. 936–973) crossed the Alps into Italy, married the young widow and had himself crowned king in Pavia in 951. He demonstrated his claim to Charlemagne's legacy with his coronation as Holy Roman Emperor in Rome in 962. Otto's successors remained keenly interested in Italian affairs but the absent German kings were unable to assert permanent authority over the local aristocracy. France was more fragmented, and although the Capetian kings remained nominally in charge, much of the political power devolved to the local lords. In the Iberian Peninsula, Asturias expanded slowly south in the 8th and 9th centuries, and continued as the Kingdom of León when the royal centre was moved from the northern Oviedo to León in the 910s.

The Eastern European trade routes towards Central Asia and the Near East were controlled by the Khazars. Their multiethnic empire resisted the Muslim expansion, and the Khazar leaders converted to Judaism by the 830s. The Khazars were nominally ruled by a sacred king, the khagan, but the commander-in-chief of his army, the beg, was the power behind the throne. At the end of the 9th century, a new trade route developed, bypassing Khazar territory and connecting Central Asia with Europe across Volga Bulgaria. Here the local elite, and by around 985 the masses of the local population converted to Islam. In Scandinavia, contacts with Francia paved the way for missionary efforts by Christian clergy, and Christianization was closely associated with the growth of centralised kingdoms in Denmark, Norway, and Sweden. Besides the settlements in the British Isles, and Normandy, Scandinavians also expanded and colonised in eastern and northern Europe. Swedish traders and slave hunters ranged down the rivers of the East European Plain, captured Kyiv from the Khazars, and even attempted to seize Constantinople in 860 and 907. Norse colonists settled in Iceland, and created a political system that hindered the accumulation of power by ambitious chieftains.

Byzantium revived its fortunes under Emperor Basil I (r. 867–886) and his successors Leo VI (r. 886–912) and Constantine VII (r. 913–959), members of the Macedonian dynasty. Commerce revived and the emperors oversaw the extension of a uniform administration to all the provinces. The imperial court was the centre of a revival of classical learning, a process known as the Macedonian Renaissance. Writers such as John Geometres (fl. early 10th century) composed new hymns, poems, and other works. The military was reorganised, which allowed the emperors John I (r. 969–976) and Basil II (r. 976–1025) to expand the frontiers of the empire on all fronts. Missionary efforts by both Eastern and Western clergy resulted in the conversion of the Moravians, Danubian Bulgars, Czechs, Poles, Magyars, and the inhabitants of the Kievan Rus'. Moravia fell victim to Magyar invasions around 900, Bulgaria to Byzantine expansionism between 971 and 1018. After the fall of Moravia, dukes of the Czech Přemyslid dynasty consolidated authority in Bohemia although they had to acknowledge the German kings' suzerainty. In Poland, the destruction of old power centres and construction of new strongholds accompanied the formation of state under the Piast dukes in the second half of the 10th century. During the same period, the princes of the Árpád dynasty applied extensive violence to crush opposition by rival Magyar chieftains in Hungary. The Rurikid princes of Kievan Rus' replaced the Khazars as the hegemon power of East Europe's vast forest zones after Rus' raiders sacked the Khazar capital Atil in 965.

Architecture and art

After the Edict of Milan legalized Christianity, new public places of worship were built in quick succession in Rome, Constantinople and the Holy Land under Constantine the Great. Basilicas, large halls that had previously been used for administrative and commercial purposes, were adapted for Christian worship. During his successors' reign, new basilicas were built in the major cities of the Roman world, and even in the post-Roman tribal kingdoms until the mid-6th century. In the late 6th century, Byzantine church architecture adopted an alternative model imitating the rectangular plan and the dome of Justinian's Hagia Sophia. Built in Constantinople after the Nika riots, the Hagia Sophia was the largest single roofed structure of the Roman world. As the spacious basilicas became of little use with the decline of urban centres in the west, they gave way to smaller churches, mainly divided into little chambers. By the beginning of the 8th century, the Carolingian Empire revived the basilica form of architecture. One new standard feature of Carolingian basilicas is the use of a transept, or the "arms" of a T-shaped building that are perpendicular to the long nave. Other new features of religious architecture include the crossing tower and a monumental entrance to the church, usually at the west end of the building.

Magnificent halls built of timber or stone were the centres of political and social life all over the early Middle Ages. Their design often adopted elements of Late Roman architecture like pilasters (on the exterior walls of Charlemagne's palace at Aachen), columns (in the Carolingian royal palace at Ingelheim), and sculptured discs (in the Asturian kings' palace at Oviedo). In Bulgaria, two splendid palace complexes were built at the royal capital Preslav—one for the tsar (or emperor), and one likely for the patriarch. In northern Europe, rural community leaders lived in large, sometimes 40-meter-long wooden houses, but most peasants shared a small wooden or wattle and daub hut with four or five other people. The leaders' houses were divided into multiple rooms, and often included a stable, whereas the peasants' huts had one or two rooms. After the disintegration of the Carolingian Empire, the spread of aristocratic castles indicates a transition from communal fortifications to private defence in western Europe. In this period, most castles were wooden structures but the wealthiest lords could afford the building of stone fortresses. One or more towers, now known as keeps, were the most characteristic features of a medieval fortress. Castles often developed into multifunctional compounds with their drawbridges, fortified courtyards, cisterns or wells, halls, chapels, stables and workshops.

Carolingian art was produced for a small group of figures around the court, and the monasteries and churches they supported. It was dominated by efforts to regain the dignity and classicism of imperial Roman and Byzantine art, but was also influenced by the Insular art of the British Isles. Insular art integrated the energy of Irish Celtic and Anglo-Saxon Germanic styles of ornament with Mediterranean forms such as the book, and established many characteristics of art for the rest of the medieval period. Surviving religious works from the Early Middle Ages are mostly illuminated manuscripts and carved ivories, originally made for metalwork that has since been melted down. Objects in precious metals were the most prestigious form of art, but almost all are lost except for a few crosses such as the Cross of Lothair, several reliquaries, and finds such as the Anglo-Saxon burial at Sutton Hoo and the hoards of Gourdon from Merovingian France, Guarrazar from Visigothic Spain and Nagyszentmiklós near Byzantine territory. There are survivals from the large brooches in fibula or penannular form that were a key piece of personal adornment for elites, including the Irish Tara Brooch. Highly decorated books were mostly Gospel Books and these have survived in larger numbers, including the Insular Book of Kells, the Book of Lindisfarne, and the imperial Codex Aureus of St. Emmeram, which is one of the few to retain its "treasure binding" of gold encrusted with jewels. Charlemagne's court seems to have been responsible for the acceptance of figurative monumental sculpture in Christian art, and by the end of the period near life-sized figures such as the Gero Cross were common in important churches.

Military and technology
During the later Roman Empire, the principal military developments were attempts to create an effective cavalry force as well as the continued development of highly specialised types of troops. The creation of heavily armoured cataphract-type soldiers as cavalry was an important feature of the Late Roman military. The various invading tribes had differing emphases on types of soldiers—ranging from the primarily infantry Anglo-Saxon invaders of Britain to the Vandals and Visigoths who had a high proportion of cavalry in their armies. The greatest change in military affairs during the invasion period was the adoption of the Hunnic composite bow in place of the earlier, and weaker, Scythian composite bow. The Avar heavy cavalry introduced the use of stirrups in Europe, and it was adopted by Byzantine cavalrymen before the end of the 6th century. Another development was the increasing use of longswords and the progressive replacement of scale armour by mail armour and lamellar armour.

The importance of infantry and light cavalry began to decline during the early Carolingian period, with a growing dominance of elite heavy cavalry. Although much of the Carolingian armies were mounted, a large proportion during the early period appear to have been mounted infantry, rather than true cavalry. The use of militia-type levies of the free population declined over the Carolingian period. One exception was Anglo-Saxon England, where the armies were still composed of regional levies, known as the fyrd, which were led by the local elites. In military technology, one of the main changes was the return of the crossbow, which had been known in Roman times and reappeared as a military weapon during the last part of the Early Middle Ages. Stirrups spread in Carolingian Europe from the 9th century, enhancing the effectiveness of the use of weapons by cavalrymen. A technological advance that had implications beyond the military was the horseshoe, which allowed horses to be used in rocky terrain.

High Middle Ages

Society

The High Middle Ages was a period of tremendous expansion of population. The estimated population of Europe grew from 35 to 80 million between 1000 and 1347, although the exact causes remain unclear: improved agricultural techniques, assarting (or bringing new lands into production), a more clement climate and the lack of invasion have all been suggested. Most medieval western thinkers divided the society of their own age into three fundamental classes. These were the clergy, the nobility, and the peasantry (or commoners). In their view, adherence to mainstream Christianity secured social cohesion.

As much as 90 percent of the European population remained rural peasants. Many were no longer settled in isolated farms but had gathered into more defensible small communities, usually known as  manors or villages. In the system of manorialism, a manor was the basic unit of landholding, and it comprised smaller components, such as parcels held by peasant tenants, and the lord's demesne. Most peasants living in a manor were subject to the manor lord. Slaveholding was declining as churchmen prohibited the enslavement of co-religionists and promoted manumission, but a new form of dependency serfdom supplanted slavery by the late 11th century. Unlike slaves, serfs had legal capacity, and their hereditary status was regulated by agreements with their lords. Restrictions on their activities varied but their freedom of movement was customarily limited, and they usually owed , or labor services, to their lords. Freemen often chose serfdom by submitting themselves to a local strongman's jurisdiction for various reasons, such as protection or the remission of a debt, but there remained free peasants throughout this period and beyond. Serfs and slaves could enhance their status by bringing new lands into cultivation because the lords of uncultivated lands rewarded colonists doing the burdensome work of assarting with freedom.

A special contractual framework, known as feudalism in modern historiography, regulated fundamental social relations between people of higher status in many parts of Europe. In this system, one party granted property, typically land to the other in return for services, mostly of military nature that the recipient, or vassal, had to render to the grantor, or lord. Although the vassals were not the owners of the land they held in fief from their lords, they could grant parts of it to their own vassals. Not all lands were held in fief. In Germany, inalienable allods remained the dominant forms of landholding. Their owners owed homage to a higher-ranking aristocrat or the king but their landholding was free of feudal obligations. With the development of heavy cavalry, the previously more or less uniform class of free warriors split into two groups. Those who could equip themselves as mounted knights were integrated into the traditional aristocracy, but others were assimilated into the peasantry. The position of the new aristocracy was stabilized through the adoption of strict inheritance customs. In many areas, lands were no longer divisible between all the heirs as had been the case in the early medieval period. Instead, most lands went to the eldest son in accordance with the newly introduced principle of primogeniture. The dominance of the nobility was built upon its landholding, military service, control of castles, and various immunities from taxes or other impositions. Control of castles provided protection from invaders or rivals, and allowed the aristocrats to defy kings or other overlords. Nobles were stratified. Kings and the highest-ranking nobility controlled large numbers of commoners and large tracts of land, as well as other nobles. Beneath them, lesser aristocrats had authority over smaller areas of land and fewer people, often only commoners. The lowest-ranking nobles did not hold land, and had to serve wealthier aristocrats. Although constituting only about one percent of the population, the nobility was never a closed group: kings could raise commoners to the aristocracy, wealthy commoners could marry into noble families, and impoverished aristocrats sometimes had to give up their privileged status.

The clergy was divided into two types: the secular clergy, who cared for the believers' spiritual needs mainly serving in the parish churches, and the regular clergy, who lived under a religious rule as monks, canons or friars. Throughout the period clerics remained a very small proportion of the population, usually about one percent. Although high-ranking clerics, like bishops and canons were mainly appointed from among the aristocracy, church career was a channel for social advancement as clerics were not born into their class but ordained to their office. Church courts had exclusive jurisdiction over marriage affairs, and churchmen supervised several aspects of everyday life. Church authorities supported popular peace movements forbidding armed conflicts during the holiest seasons of the liturgical year, and offering spiritual protection for serfs, pilgrims, women and children during wartime.

Women in the Middle Ages were officially required to be subordinate to some male, whether their father, husband, or other kinsman. Women's work generally consisted of household or other domestically inclined tasks such as child-care. Peasant women could supplement the household income by spinning or brewing at home, and they were also expected to help with field-work at harvest-time. Townswomen could engage in trade but often only by right of their husband, and unlike their male competitors, they were not always allowed to train apprentices. Noblewomen could inherit land in the absence of a male heir but their potential to give birth to children was regarded as their principal virtue. The only role open to women in the Church was that of nuns, as they were unable to become priests.

Trade and economy

The expansion of population, greater agricultural productivity and relative political stability laid the foundations for the medieval "Commercial Revolution" in the 11th century. People with surplus cash began investing in commodities like salt, pepper and silk at faraway markets. Rising trade brought new methods of dealing with money, and gold coinage was again minted in Europe, first in Italy and later in France. Accounting methods improved, partly through the use of double-entry bookkeeping. Bills of exchange also appeared, enabling easy transmission of money. As many types of coins were in circulation, money changers facilitated transactions between local and foreign merchants. Loans could also be negotiated with them which gave rise to the development of credit institutions called banks for the money changers' , or benches. As new towns were developing from local commercial centres near fortresses, bridges or harbours, the economic growth brought about a new wave of urbanisation. Kings and aristocrats mainly supported the process in the hope of increased tax revenues. Most urban communities received privileges acknowledging their autonomy but few cities could get rid of all elements of royal or aristocratic control. Townsmen were in a somewhat unusual position, as they did not fit into the traditional three-fold division of society. Throughout the Middle Ages the population of the towns probably never exceeded 10 percent of the total population.

The Italian maritime republics such as Amalfi, Venice, Genoa, and Pisa were the first to profit from the revival of commerce in the Mediterranean. Great trading fairs were established and flourished in northern France, allowing Italian and German merchants to trade with each other as well as local merchants. In the late 13th century new land and sea routes to the Far East were pioneered, famously described in The Travels of Marco Polo written by one of the traders, Marco Polo (d. 1324). Economic growth provided opportunities to Jewish merchants to spread all over Europe, mainly with the active support of kings, bishops or aristocrats. Although the Christian rulers appreciated the Jews' contribution to the local economy, many commoners regarded the non-Christian newcomers as an imminent threat to social cohesion. As they could not engage in prestigious trades outside their communities, they often took despised jobs such as ragmen or tax collectors. They were especially active in moneylending for they could ignore the Christian clerics' condemnation on loan interest. The Jewish moneylenders and pawn brokers reinforced antisemitism, which led to accusations of blasphemy, blood libels, and pogroms. Church authorities' growing concerns about Jewish influence on Christian life inspired segregationist laws, and even their permanent expulsion from England in 1290.

Technology and military

Technology developed mainly through minor innovations and by the adoption of advanced technologies from Asia through Muslim mediation. Major technological advances included the first mechanical clocks, the manufacture of distilled spirits, and the use of the astrolabe. Convex spectacles were probably invented around 1286 by an unknown Italian artisan working in or near Pisa. Originally developed in the Middle East, windmills were first built in Europe in the 12th century; spinning wheels had been used in India and China for centuries before they appeared in southern Europe around 1200.

The development of a three-field rotation system for planting crops increased the usage of land from one half in use each year under the old two-field system to two-thirds under the new system, with a consequent increase in production. The development of the heavy plough allowed heavier soils to be farmed more efficiently, aided by the spread of horse collar, which led to the use of draught horses. Horses are faster than oxen and require less pasture, factors that aided the implementation of the three-field system. Legumes – such as peas, beans, or lentils – were grown more widely as crops, in addition to the usual cereal crops of wheat, oats, barley, and rye.

The construction of cathedrals and castles advanced building technology, leading to the development of large stone buildings. Ancillary structures included new town halls, hospitals, bridges, and tithe barns. Shipbuilding improved with the use of the rib and plank method rather than the old Roman system of mortise and tenon. Other improvements to ships included the use of lateen sails and the stern-post rudder, both of which increased the speed at which ships could be sailed.

In military affairs, the use of infantry with specialised roles increased. Along with the still-dominant heavy cavalry, armies often included mounted and infantry crossbowmen, as well as sappers and engineers. Crossbows, which had been known as hunting weapons, increased in use partly because of the increase in siege warfare in the 10th and 11th centuries. The increasing use of crossbows during the 12th and 13th centuries led to the use of closed-face helmets, heavy body armour, as well as horse armour. Gunpowder was known in Europe by the mid-13th century with a recorded use in European warfare by the English against the Scots in 1304, although it was merely used as an explosive and not as a weapon.

Church life

In the early 11th century, papal elections were controlled by Roman aristocrats but their power was broken by Emperor Henry III (r. 1039–56) who placed reform-minded clerics to the papal throne. One of them, Leo IX (pope 1049–54) demonstrated papal supremacy in many parts of Europe by presiding over popular assemblies where high-ranking clerics accused of simony were forced to beg for his forgiveness. In contrast, the head of the Byzantine Church Patriarch Michael I Cerularius (d. 1059) refused the popes' claim to supreme jurisdiction for which a papal legate excommunicated him in Constantinople in 1054. Eventually, after a string of mutual excommunications, this event, known as East–West Schism, led to the division of Christianity into two Churches—the Western branch became the Roman Catholic Church and the Eastern branch the Eastern Orthodox Church. Lay investiture—the appointment of clerics by secular rulers—was condemned at an assembly of Catholic bishops in Rome in 1059, and the same synod established the exclusive right of the College of Cardinals to elect the popes. Henry's son and successor Henry IV (r. 1056–1105) wanted to preserve the right to appoint his own choices as bishops within his lands but his appointments outraged Pope Gregory VII (pope 1073–85). Their quarrel developed into the Investiture Controversy, involving other powers as well for kings did not relinquish the control of appointments to bishoprics voluntarily. All conflicts ended with a compromise, in the case of the Holy Roman Emperors with the 1122 Concordat of Worms, mainly acknowledging the monarchs' claims.

The High Middle Ages was a period of great religious movements. Old pilgrimage sites such as Rome, Jerusalem, and Compostela received increasing numbers of visitors, and new sites such as Monte Gargano and Bari rose to prominence. Popular movements emerged to support the implementation of reformist ideas at local level but radical anticlericalism could lead to the denial of Church hierarchy and Catholic dogmas. The Patarenes went as far as to punish sinful clerics; the Waldensians ignored priestly monopolies such as preaching; and the Cathars adopted the Bogomils' dualist doctrine. To suppress heresies, the popes appointed special commissioners of investigation known as inquisitors. They could use torture to extract confession from suspects and hand over those who persisted with heretic views to secular authorities to be burned at the stake. Initially, the use of torture and the application of capital punishment were exceptional. Monastic reforms continued as the Cluniac monasteries' splendid ceremonies were alien to those who preferred the simpler hermetical monasticism of early Christianity, or wanted to live the "Apostolic life" of poverty and preaching. New monastic orders were established, including the Carthusians who lived mainly in seclusion in private cells in their monasteries, and the Cistercians who settled in the wilderness and revived the Benedictine tradition of manual labour. In the 13th century mendicant orders—the Franciscans and the Dominicans—who swore vows of poverty and earned their living by begging, were approved by the papacy.

Rise of state power

The High Middle Ages saw the development of institutions that would dominate political life in Europe till the late 18th century. Representative assemblies came into being in most countries, in kingdoms and city-states alike, that exerted influence on state administration through their control of taxation. The concept of hereditary monarchy was strengthening in parallel with the development of laws governing the inheritance of land. As female succession was recognised in most countries, the first reigning queens assumed power in this period. The queen mother's claim to assume the regency for her underage son was also widely acknowledged by the end of the 12th century.

The papacy, long attached to an ideology of independence from secular influence, first asserted its claim to temporal authority over the entire Christian world, but this new identity led to conflicts with the western emperors and Italian rulers. In the Holy Roman Empire, the Ottonians were replaced by the Salians in 1024. They protected the lesser nobility to reduce the German dukes' power and seized Burgundy before clashing with the papacy under Henry IV. After a short interval between 1125 and 1137, the Hohenstaufens succeeded the Salians. Their recurring conflicts with the papacy allowed the northern Italian cities and the German ecclesiastic and secular princes to extort considerable concessions from the emperors. In 1183,  Barbarossa (r. 1155–90) sanctioned the right of the Lombard cities to elect their leaders; the German princes' judicial and economic privileges were confirmed during the reign of his grandson  (r. 1220–50). Frederick, who had grown up in his mother's multicultural Sicilian kingdom, was famed for his erudition and unconventional life style but his efforts to rule Italy eventually led to the fall of his dynasty. In Germany, a period of interregnum, or rather civil war began, whereas Sicily was seized by an ambitious French prince Charles I of Anjou (r. 1266–85). During the German civil war, the tradition of elective monarchy revived, and the right of seven prince-electors to elect the king was reaffirmed. Rudolf of Habsburg (r. 1273–91), the first king to be elected after the interregnum, realised that he was unable to control the whole empire. He granted Austria to his sons, thus establishing the basis for the Habsburgs' future dominance in Central Europe.

Under the Capetian dynasty the French monarchy slowly began to expand its authority over the nobility, growing out of the Île-de-France to exert control over more of the country in the 11th and 12th centuries. They faced a powerful rival in the Dukes of Normandy, who in 1066 under William the Conqueror (r. 1035–87), conquered England and created a cross-Channel empire that lasted, in various forms, throughout the rest of the Middle Ages. Norman warbands seized southern Italy and Sicily from the local Lombard, Byzantine and Muslim rulers. Their hold of the territory was recognised by the papacy in 1059, and Roger II (r. 1105–54) united these lands into the Kingdom of Sicily. Richard's younger brother John (r. 1199–1216) lost Normandy and the rest of the northern French possessions in 1204 to the French king Philip II Augustus (r. 1180–1223). This led to dissension among the English nobility, while John's financial exactions to pay for his unsuccessful attempts to regain Normandy led in 1215 to Magna Carta, a charter that confirmed the rights and privileges of free men in England. Under  (r. 1216–72), John's son, further concessions were made to the nobility, and royal power was diminished. In France, Philip Augustus's son  (r. 1223–26) distributed large portions of his father's conquests among his younger sons as appanages—virtually independent provinces—to facilitate their administration. On his death his widow Blanche of Castile (d. 1252) assumed the regency, and crushed a series of aristocratic revolts. During his reign, the royal court at Paris began hearing litigants in regular sessions almost all over the year.

By about 1150, the Christian north had coalesced into the five major kingdoms of León, Castile, Aragon, Navarre, and Portugal. Southern Iberia remained under control of Islamic states, initially under the Caliphate of Córdoba, which broke up in 1031 into a shifting number of petty states known as taifas. Although the Almoravids and the Almohads, two dynasties from the Maghreb, established centralised rule over Southern Iberia in the 1110s and 1170s respectively, their empires quickly disintegrated. Christian forces advanced again in the early 13th century, culminating in the capture of Seville in 1248. In the east, Kievan Rus' fell apart into independent principalities. Among them the northern Vladimir-Suzdal emerged as the dominant power after Suzdalian troops sacked Kyiv in 1169. Poland also disintegrated into autonomous duchies in 1138, enabling the Czech kings to seize parts of the prosperous Duchy of Silesia in the late 13th century. The kings of Hungary seized Croatia but respected the liberties of the native aristocracy. They claimed (but only periodically achieved) suzerainty over other lands and peoples such as Dalmatia, Bosnia, the Rus' principality of Halych, and the nomadic Cumans. The Cumans supported the Bulgarians and Vlachs during their anti-Byzantine revolt that led to the restoration of Bulgaria in the late 12th century. In two decades, the new state developed into the Balkans' hegemonic power. To the west of Bulgaria, Serbia gained independence with the decline of Byzantine dominance in the region.

With the rise of the Mongol Empire in the Eurasian steppes under Genghis Khan (r. 1206–27), a new expansionist power reached Europe's eastern borderlands. Convinced of their heavenly sanctioned mission to conquer the world, the Mongols used extreme violence to overcome all resistance. Between 1236 and 1242, they conquered Volga Bulgaria, shattered the Rus' principalities, and laid waste to large regions in Poland, Hungary, Croatia, Serbia and Bulgaria. Their commander-in-chief Batu Khan (r. 1241–56)—a grandson of Genghis Khan—set up his capital at Sarai on the Volga, establishing the Golden Horde, a Mongol state nominally under the distant Great Khan's authority. The Mongols extracted heavy tribute from the Rus' principalities, and the Rus' princes had to ingratiate themselves with the Mongol khans for economic and political concessions. The Mongol conquest was followed by a peaceful period in Eastern Europe. This  facilitated the development of direct trade contacts between Europe and China through newly established Genoese colonies in the Black Sea region.

Crusades

Clashes with secular powers during the Investiture Controversy accelerated the militarization of the papacy. Pope Gregory VII promised salvation to those who took up arms against his enemies, and for a while he was planning to lead a military campaign against the Muslim Turks in support of the Byzantines. The Turks had routed the Byzantine army at the Battle of Manzikert in 1071, and seized much of Asia Minor. In 1095, the Byzantine Emperor Alexios I Komnenos (r. 1081–1118) appealed for aid against further Turkic advances to the western Christians. In response, Pope Urban II (pope 1088–99) proclaimed the First Crusade at the Council of Clermont, declaring the liberation of Jerusalem as its ultimate goal, and offering indulgence—the remission of sins—to all who took part.

Tens of thousands of fanatics, mainly common people, were the first to leave for the crusade in loosely organised bands from France and Germany. On their journey, they lived of looting and attacked the Jewish communities. Antisemitic pogroms were especially violent in the Rhineland. Few of the first crusaders reached Asia Minor, and those who succeeded were annihilated by the Turks. The official crusade departed after harvest time in 1096 under the command of prominent aristocrats like Godfrey of Bouillon (d. 1100), and Raymond of Saint-Gilles (d. 1105). They defeated the Turks in two major battles at Dorylaeum and Antioch, allowing the Byzantines to recover western Asia Minor. The westerners consolidated their conquests into crusader states in northern Syria and Palestine, but their security depended on external military assistance which led to further crusades. Muslim resistance was raised by ambitious warlords, like Saladin (d. 1193) who captured Jerusalem in 1187. New crusades prolonged the crusader states' existence for another century, until the crusaders' last strongholds fell to the Mamluks of Egypt in 1291.

The papacy used the crusading ideology against its opponents and non-Catholic groups in other theaters of war as well. The northern German and Scandinavian rulers' expansion against the neighbouring pagan tribes developed into the Northern Crusades bringing the forced assimilation of numerous Slavic, Baltic and Finnic peoples into the culture of Catholic Europe. The Fourth Crusade was diverted from the Holy Land to Constantinople, and captured the city in 1204, setting up a Latin Empire of Constantinople. Michael VIII Palaiologos (r. 1259–1282), the ruler of a Byzantine rump state in Asia Minor recaptured the city in 1261, but the Byzantines never regained their former strength, and parts of Greece remained under the westerners' rule. The Albigensian Crusades against the Cathars of Occitania provided the opportunity for the French monarchy to expand into the region.

With its specific ceremonies and institutions, the crusading movement became a featuring element of medieval life. Often extraordinary taxes were levied to finance the crusades, and from 1213 a crusader oath could be fulfilled through a cash payment which gave rise to the sale of plenary indulgences by Church authorities. The crusades brought about the fusion of monastic life with military service within the framework of a new type of monastic order, the military orders. The establishment of the Knights Templar set the precedent, inspiring the militarization of charitable associations, like the Hospitallers and the Teutonic Knights, and the founding of new orders of warrior monks, like the Order of Calatrava and the Livonian Brothers of the Sword. Although established in the crusader states, the Teutonic Order focused much of its activity in the Baltic where they founded their own state in 1226.

Intellectual life

As a consequence of the Church reform movement, cathedral chapters were required to operate a school from the late 11th century. Cathedral schools quickly marginalised the traditional monastic schools because their students were not required to live under strict monastic rules. Their new status granted the students who had completed their curricula the right to teach anywhere in Catholic Europe, and the opportunity to rise to a high position in state or Church administration. The new institutions of education led to increased intellectual activity. There was debate between the realists and the nominalists over the concept of "universals". Philosophical discourse was stimulated by the rediscovery of Aristotle and his emphasis on empiricism and rationalism. Scholars such as Peter Abelard (d. 1142) and Peter Lombard (d. 1164) introduced Aristotelian logic into theology. Philosophy and theology fused in scholasticism, an attempt by 12th- and 13th-century scholars to reconcile authoritative texts, most notably Aristotle and the Bible. This movement tried to employ a systemic approach to truth and reason and culminated in the thought of Thomas Aquinas (d. 1274), who wrote the Summa Theologica, or Summary of Theology.  

Chivalry and the ethos of courtly love developed in royal and noble courts. This culture was expressed in the vernacular languages rather than Latin, and comprised poems, stories, legends, and popular songs. These stories often glorified their male heroes' brutality. In contrast, chivalric romance usually praised chaste love, while eroticism was mainly present in poems composed by the southern lyric poets known as troubadours. Chivalric literature took inspiration from classical mythology, and also from the Celtic legends of the Arthurian cycle collected by Geoffrey of Monmouth (d. c. 1155) in his . Spiritual autobiographies, chronicles, philosophical poems, and hymns to Christ or the Virgin Mary were also among the featuring literary genres of the High Middle Ages.

Legal studies advanced during the 12th century. This led to the recording and standardisation of legal codes throughout Western Europe.

Among the results of the Greek and Islamic influence on this period in European history was the replacement of Roman numerals with the decimal positional number system and the invention of algebra, which allowed more advanced mathematics. Astronomy advanced following the translation of Ptolemy's Almagest from Greek into Latin in the late 12th century. Medicine was also studied, especially in southern Italy, where Islamic medicine influenced the school at Salerno.

Architecture, art, and music

In the 10th century the establishment of churches and monasteries led to the development of stone architecture that elaborated vernacular Roman forms, from which the term "Romanesque" is derived. Where available, Roman brick and stone buildings were recycled for their materials. From the tentative beginnings known as the First Romanesque, the style flourished and spread across Europe in a remarkably homogeneous form. Just before 1000 there was a great wave of building stone churches all over Europe. Romanesque buildings have massive stone walls, openings topped by semi-circular arches, small windows, and, particularly in France, arched stone vaults. The large portal with coloured sculpture in high relief became a central feature of façades, especially in France, and the capitals of columns were often carved with narrative scenes of imaginative monsters and animals. According to art historian C. R. Dodwell, "virtually all the churches in the West were decorated with wall-paintings", of which few survive. Simultaneous with the development in church architecture, the distinctive European form of the castle was developed and became crucial to politics and warfare.

Romanesque art, especially metalwork, was at its most sophisticated in Mosan art, in which distinct artistic personalities including Nicholas of Verdun (d. 1205) become apparent, and an almost classical style is seen in works such as a font at Liège, contrasting with the writhing animals of the exactly contemporary Gloucester Candlestick. Large illuminated bibles and psalters were the typical forms of luxury manuscripts, and wall-painting flourished in churches, often following a scheme with a Last Judgement on the west wall, a Christ in Majesty at the east end, and narrative biblical scenes down the nave, or in the best surviving example, at Saint-Savin-sur-Gartempe, on the barrel-vaulted roof.

From the early 12th century, French builders developed the Gothic style, marked by the use of rib vaults, pointed arches, flying buttresses, and large stained glass windows. It was used mainly in churches and cathedrals and continued in use until the 16th century in much of Europe. Classic examples of Gothic architecture include Chartres Cathedral and Reims Cathedral in France as well as Salisbury Cathedral in England. Stained glass became a crucial element in the design of churches, which continued to use extensive wall-paintings, now almost all lost.

During this period the practice of manuscript illumination gradually passed from monasteries to lay workshops, so that according to Janetta Benton "by 1300 most monks bought their books in shops", and the book of hours developed as a form of devotional book for lay-people. Metalwork continued to be the most prestigious form of art, with Limoges enamel a popular and relatively affordable option for objects such as reliquaries and crosses. In Italy the innovations of Cimabue and Duccio, followed by the Trecento master Giotto (d. 1337), greatly increased the sophistication and status of panel painting and fresco. Increasing prosperity during the 12th century resulted in greater production of secular art; many carved ivory objects such as gaming-pieces, combs, and small religious figures have survived.

Late Middle Ages

War, famine, and plague

The first years of the 14th century were marked by famines, culminating in the Great Famine of 1315–17. The causes of the Great Famine included the slow transition from the Medieval Warm Period to the Little Ice Age, which left the population vulnerable when bad weather caused agricultural crises. The years 1313–14 and 1317–21 were excessively rainy throughout Europe, resulting in widespread crop failures. The climate change—which resulted in a declining average annual temperature for Europe during the 14th century—was accompanied by an economic downturn.

These troubles were followed in 1347 by the Black Death, a pandemic that spread throughout Europe during the following three years. The death toll was probably about 35 million people in Europe, about one-third of the population. Towns were especially hard-hit because of their crowded conditions. Large areas of land were left sparsely inhabited, and in some places fields were left unworked. Wages rose as landlords sought to entice the reduced number of available workers to their fields. Further problems were lower rents and lower demand for food, both of which cut into agricultural income. Urban workers also felt that they had a right to greater earnings, and popular uprisings broke out across Europe. Among the uprisings were the jacquerie in France, the Peasants' Revolt in England, and revolts in the cities of Florence in Italy and Ghent and Bruges in Flanders. The trauma of the plague led to an increased piety throughout Europe, manifested by the foundation of new charities, the self-mortification of the flagellants, and the scapegoating of Jews. Conditions were further unsettled by the return of the plague throughout the rest of the 14th century; it continued to strike Europe periodically during the rest of the Middle Ages.

These dire conditions resulted in an increase of interpersonal violence in most parts of Europe. Population increase, religious intolerance, famine and disease led to an increase in violent acts in vast parts of the medieval society. One exception to this was North-Eastern Europe, whose population managed to maintain low levels of violence due to a more organized society resulting from extensive and successful trade.

Society and economy
Society throughout Europe was disturbed by the dislocations caused by the Black Death. Lands that had been marginally productive were abandoned, as the survivors were able to acquire more fertile areas. Although serfdom declined in Western Europe it became more common in Eastern Europe, as landlords imposed it on those of their tenants who had previously been free. Most peasants in Western Europe managed to change the work they had previously owed to their landlords into cash rents. The percentage of serfs amongst the peasantry declined from a high of 90 to closer to 50 percent by the end of the period. Landlords also became more conscious of common interests with other landholders, and they joined to extort privileges from their governments. Partly at the urging of landlords, governments attempted to legislate a return to the economic conditions that existed before the Black Death. Non-clergy became increasingly literate, and urban populations began to imitate the nobility's interest in chivalry.

Jewish communities were expelled from England in 1290 and from France in 1306. Although some were allowed back into France, most were not, and many Jews emigrated eastwards, settling in Poland and Hungary. The Jews were expelled from Spain in 1492, and dispersed to Turkey, France, Italy, and Holland. The rise of banking in Italy during the 13th century continued throughout the 14th century, fuelled partly by the increasing warfare of the period and the needs of the papacy to move money between kingdoms. Many banking firms loaned money to royalty, at great risk, as some were bankrupted when kings defaulted on their loans.

State resurgence

Strong, royalty-based nation states rose throughout Europe in the Late Middle Ages, particularly in England, France, and the Christian kingdoms of the Iberian Peninsula: Aragon, Castile, and Portugal. The long conflicts of the period strengthened royal control over their kingdoms and were extremely hard on the peasantry. Kings profited from warfare that extended royal legislation and increased the lands they directly controlled. Paying for the wars required that methods of taxation become more effective and efficient, and the rate of taxation often increased. The requirement to obtain the consent of taxpayers allowed representative bodies such as the English Parliament and the French Estates General to gain power and authority.

Throughout the 14th century, French kings sought to expand their influence at the expense of the territorial holdings of the nobility. They ran into difficulties when attempting to confiscate the holdings of the English kings in southern France, leading to the Hundred Years' War, waged from 1337 to 1453. Early in the war the English under Edward III (r. 1327–77) and his son Edward, the Black Prince (d. 1376), won the battles of Crécy and Poitiers, captured the city of Calais, and won control of much of France. The resulting stresses almost caused the disintegration of the French kingdom during the early years of the war. In the early 15th century, France again came close to dissolving, but in the late 1420s the military successes of Joan of Arc (d. 1431) led to the victory of the French and the capture of the last English possessions in southern France in 1453. The price was high, as the population of France at the end of the Wars was likely half what it had been at the start of the conflict. Conversely, the Wars had a positive effect on English national identity, doing much to fuse the various local identities into a national English ideal. The conflict with France also helped create a national culture in England separate from French culture, which had previously been the dominant influence. The dominance of the English longbow began during early stages of the Hundred Years' War, and cannon appeared on the battlefield at Crécy in 1346.

In modern-day Germany, the Holy Roman Empire continued to rule, but the elective nature of the imperial crown meant there was no enduring dynasty around which a strong state could form. Further east, the kingdoms of Poland, Hungary, and Bohemia grew powerful. In Iberia, the Christian kingdoms continued to gain land from the Muslim kingdoms of the peninsula; Portugal concentrated on expanding overseas during the 15th century, while the other kingdoms were riven by difficulties over royal succession and other concerns. After losing the Hundred Years' War, England went on to suffer a long civil war known as the Wars of the Roses, which lasted into the 1490s and only ended when Henry Tudor (r. 1485–1509 as Henry VII) became king and consolidated power with his victory over Richard III (r. 1483–85) at Bosworth in 1485. In Scandinavia, Margaret I of Denmark (r. in Denmark 1387–1412) consolidated Norway, Denmark, and Sweden in the Union of Kalmar, which continued until 1523. The major power around the Baltic Sea was the Hanseatic League, a commercial confederation of city-states that traded from Western Europe to Russia. Scotland emerged from English domination under Robert the Bruce (r. 1306–29), who secured papal recognition of his kingship in 1328.

Collapse of Byzantium and rise of the Ottomans

Although the Palaiologos emperors recaptured Constantinople from the Western Europeans in 1261, they were never able to regain control of much of the former imperial lands. They usually controlled only a small section of the Balkan Peninsula near Constantinople, the city itself, and some coastal lands on the Black Sea and around the Aegean Sea. The former Byzantine lands in the Balkans were divided between the new Kingdom of Serbia, the Second Bulgarian Empire and the city-state of Venice. The power of the Byzantine emperors was threatened by a new Turkish tribe, the Ottomans, who established themselves in Anatolia in the 13th century and steadily expanded throughout the 14th century. The Ottomans expanded into Europe, reducing Bulgaria to a vassal state by 1366 and taking over Serbia after its defeat at the Battle of Kosovo in 1389. Western Europeans rallied to the plight of the Christians in the Balkans and declared a new crusade in 1396; a great army was sent to the Balkans, where it was defeated at the Battle of Nicopolis. Constantinople was finally captured by the Ottomans in 1453. The Ottoman Empire's ever more aggressive policy of conquest became a horror for the Christian world.

Controversy within the Church

During the tumultuous 14th century, disputes within the leadership of the Church led to the Avignon Papacy of 1309–76, also called the "Babylonian Captivity of the Papacy" (a reference to the Babylonian captivity of the Jews), and then to the Great Schism, lasting from 1378 to 1418, when there were two and later three rival popes, each supported by several states. Ecclesiastical officials convened at the Council of Constance in 1414, and in the following year the council deposed one of the rival popes, leaving only two claimants. Further depositions followed, and in November 1417, the council elected Martin V (pope 1417–31) as pope.

Besides the schism, the Western Church was riven by theological controversies, some of which turned into heresies. John Wycliffe (d. 1384), an English theologian, was condemned as a heretic in 1415 for teaching that the laity should have access to the text of the Bible as well as for holding views on the Eucharist that were contrary to Church doctrine. Wycliffe's teachings influenced two of the major heretical movements of the later Middle Ages: Lollardy in England and Hussitism in Bohemia. The Bohemian movement initiated with the teaching of Jan Hus, who was burned at the stake in 1415, after being condemned as a heretic by the Council of Constance. The Hussite Church, although the target of a crusade, survived beyond the Middle Ages. Other heresies were manufactured, such as the accusations against the Knights Templar that resulted in their suppression in 1312, and the division of their great wealth between the French King Philip IV (r. 1285–1314) and the Hospitallers.

The papacy further refined the practice in the Mass in the Late Middle Ages, holding that the clergy alone was allowed to partake of the wine in the Eucharist. This further distanced the secular laity from the clergy. The laity continued the practices of pilgrimages, veneration of relics, and belief in the power of the Devil. Mystics such as Meister Eckhart (d. 1327) and Thomas à Kempis (d. 1471) wrote works that taught the laity to focus on their inner spiritual life, which laid the groundwork for the Protestant Reformation. Besides mysticism, belief in witches and witchcraft became widespread, and by the late 15th century the Church had begun to lend credence to populist fears of witchcraft with its condemnation of witches in 1484, and the publication in 1486 of the Malleus Maleficarum, the most popular handbook for witch-hunters.

Scholars, intellectuals, and exploration

During the Later Middle Ages, theologians such as John Duns Scotus (d. 1308) and William of Ockham (d. c. 1348) led a reaction against intellectualist scholasticism, objecting to the application of reason to faith. Their efforts undermined the prevailing Platonic idea of universals. Ockham's insistence that reason operates independently of faith allowed science to be separated from theology and philosophy. Legal studies were marked by the steady advance of Roman law into areas of jurisprudence previously governed by customary law. The lone exception to this trend was in England, where the common law remained pre-eminent. Other countries codified their laws; legal codes were promulgated in Castile, Poland, and Lithuania.

Education remained mostly focused on the training of future clergy. The basic learning of the letters and numbers remained the province of the family or a village priest, but the secondary subjects of the trivium—grammar, rhetoric, logic—were studied in cathedral schools or in schools provided by cities. Commercial secondary schools spread, and some Italian towns had more than one such enterprise. Universities also spread throughout Europe in the 14th and 15th centuries. Lay literacy rates rose, but were still low; one estimate gave a literacy rate of ten percent of males and one percent of females in 1500.

The publication of vernacular literature increased, with Dante (d. 1321), Petrarch and Boccaccio in 14th-century Italy, Geoffrey Chaucer (d. 1400) and William Langland (d. c. 1386) in England, and François Villon (d. 1464) and Christine de Pizan (d. c. 1430) in France. Much literature remained religious in character, and although a great deal of it continued to be written in Latin, a new demand developed for saints' lives and other devotional tracts in the vernacular languages. This was fed by the growth of the Devotio Moderna movement, most prominently in the formation of the Brethren of the Common Life, but also in the works of German mystics such as Meister Eckhart and Johannes Tauler (d. 1361). Theatre also developed in the guise of miracle plays put on by the Church. At the end of the period, the development of the printing press in about 1450 led to the establishment of publishing houses throughout Europe by 1500.

In the early 15th century, the countries of the Iberian Peninsula began to sponsor exploration beyond the boundaries of Europe. Prince Henry the Navigator of Portugal (d. 1460) sent expeditions that discovered the Canary Islands, the Azores, and Cape Verde during his lifetime. After his death, exploration continued; Bartolomeu Dias (d. 1500) went around the Cape of Good Hope in 1486, and Vasco da Gama (d. 1524) sailed around Africa to India in 1498. The combined Spanish monarchies of Castile and Aragon sponsored the voyage of exploration by Christopher Columbus (d. 1506) in 1492 that led to his discovery of the Americas. The English crown under Henry VII sponsored the voyage of John Cabot (d. 1498) in 1497, which landed on Cape Breton Island.

Technological and military developments

One of the major developments in the military sphere during the Late Middle Ages was the increased use of infantry and light cavalry. The English also employed longbowmen, but other countries were unable to create similar forces with the same success. Armour continued to advance, spurred by the increasing power of crossbows, and plate armour was developed to protect soldiers from crossbows as well as the hand-held guns that were developed. Pole arms reached new prominence with the development of the Flemish and Swiss infantry armed with pikes and other long spears.

In agriculture, the increased usage of sheep with long-fibred wool allowed a stronger thread to be spun. In addition, the spinning wheel replaced the traditional distaff for spinning wool, tripling production. A less technological refinement that still greatly affected daily life was the use of buttons as closures for garments, which allowed for better fitting without having to lace clothing on the wearer. Windmills were refined with the creation of the tower mill, allowing the upper part of the windmill to be spun around to face the direction from which the wind was blowing. The blast furnace appeared around 1350 in Sweden, increasing the quantity of iron produced and improving its quality. The first patent law in 1447 in Venice protected the rights of inventors to their inventions.

Late medieval art and architecture

The Late Middle Ages in Europe as a whole correspond to the Trecento and Early Renaissance cultural periods in Italy. Northern Europe and Spain continued to use Gothic styles, which became increasingly elaborate in the 15th century, until almost the end of the period. International Gothic was a courtly style that reached much of Europe in the decades around 1400, producing masterpieces such as the Très Riches Heures du Duc de Berry. All over Europe secular art continued to increase in quantity and quality, and in the 15th century the mercantile classes of Italy and Flanders became important patrons, commissioning small portraits of themselves in oils as well as a growing range of luxury items such as jewellery, ivory caskets, cassone chests, and maiolica pottery. These objects also included the Hispano-Moresque ware produced by mostly Mudéjar potters in Spain. Although royalty owned huge collections of plate, little survives except for the Royal Gold Cup. Italian silk manufacture developed, so that Western churches and elites no longer needed to rely on imports from Byzantium or the Islamic world. In France and Flanders tapestry weaving of sets like The Lady and the Unicorn became a major luxury industry.

The large external sculptural schemes of Early Gothic churches gave way to more sculpture inside the building, as tombs became more elaborate and other features such as pulpits were sometimes lavishly carved, as in the Pulpit by Giovanni Pisano in Sant'Andrea. Painted or carved wooden relief altarpieces became common, especially as churches created many side-chapels. Early Netherlandish painting by artists such as Jan van Eyck (d. 1441) and Rogier van der Weyden (d. 1464) rivalled that of Italy, as did northern illuminated manuscripts, which in the 15th century began to be collected on a large scale by secular elites, who also commissioned secular books, especially histories. From about 1450 printed books rapidly became popular, though still expensive. There were around 30,000 different editions of incunabula, or works printed before 1500, by which time illuminated manuscripts were commissioned only by royalty and a few others. Very small woodcuts, nearly all religious, were affordable even by peasants in parts of Northern Europe from the middle of the 15th century. More expensive engravings supplied a wealthier market with a variety of images.

Modern perceptions

The medieval period is frequently caricatured as a "time of ignorance and superstition" that placed "the word of religious authorities over personal experience and rational activity." This is a legacy from both the Renaissance and Enlightenment when scholars favourably contrasted their intellectual cultures with those of the medieval period. Renaissance scholars saw the Middle Ages as a period of decline from the high culture and civilisation of the Classical world. Enlightenment scholars saw reason as superior to faith, and thus viewed the Middle Ages as a time of ignorance and superstition.

Others argue that reason was generally held in high regard during the Middle Ages. Science historian Edward Grant writes, "If revolutionary rational thoughts were expressed [in the 18th century], they were only made possible because of the long medieval tradition that established the use of reason as one of the most important of human activities". Also, contrary to common belief, David Lindberg writes, "the late medieval scholar rarely experienced the coercive power of the Church and would have regarded himself as free (particularly in the natural sciences) to follow reason and observation wherever they led".

The caricature of the period is also reflected in some more specific notions. One misconception, first propagated in the 19th century and still very common, is that all people in the Middle Ages believed that the Earth was flat. This is untrue, as lecturers in the medieval universities commonly argued that evidence showed the Earth was a sphere. Lindberg and Ronald Numbers, another scholar of the period, state that there "was scarcely a Christian scholar of the Middle Ages who did not acknowledge [Earth's] sphericity and even know its approximate circumference". Other misconceptions such as "the Church prohibited autopsies and dissections during the Middle Ages", "the rise of Christianity killed off ancient science", or "the medieval Christian Church suppressed the growth of natural philosophy", are all cited by Numbers as examples of widely popular myths that still pass as historical truth, although they are not supported by historical research.

Notes

Citations

References

Further reading

External links
 De Re Militari: The Society for Medieval Military History
 Medieval Realms Learning resources from the British Library including studies of beautiful medieval manuscripts.
 Medievalists.net News and articles about the period.
 Medieval History Database (MHDB)
 Medieval Worlds, Official website – Comparative and interdisciplinary articles about the period.
 The Labyrinth Resources for Medieval Studies.

5th century
6th century in Europe
7th century in Europe
8th century in Europe
9th century in Europe
10th century in Europe
11th century in Europe
12th century in Europe
13th century in Europe
14th century in Europe
15th century in Europe
Christianization
Dark ages
Featured articles
Historical eras
History of Europe by period
 
Wikipedia pages semi-protected against vandalism